Midwest School is a public school in the Natrona County School District in Midwest, Wyoming, United States. It is the only school in the district that serves students in preschool through 12th grade. The school has about 175 students who come from the communities of Midwest and Edgerton, as well as from Casper.

Midwest School was closed over volatile organic compounds in 2016.  Students will go to classes elsewhere in the fall.

References

External links
School District school webpage

Schools in Natrona County, Wyoming
Public elementary schools in Wyoming
Public middle schools in Wyoming
Public high schools in Wyoming